The Black Creek Group is a geologic group in North Carolina. It preserves fossils dating back to the Late Cretaceous period.

Paleofauna
 cf. Deinosuchus rugosus 
 cf. Coelosaurus antiquus 
 cf. Dryptosaurus sp.
 cf. Lophorhoton atopus
 Hypsibema crassicauda - "Caudal vertebrae, fragmentary humerus, fragmentary tibia, metatarsal II."
 Leptoceratopsidae indet.
 Dromaeosauridae indet.

See also

 List of dinosaur-bearing rock formations
 List of stratigraphic units with few dinosaur genera
 List of fossiliferous stratigraphic units in North Carolina

References

 Weishampel, David B.; Dodson, Peter; and Osmólska, Halszka (eds.): The Dinosauria, 2nd, Berkeley: University of California Press. 861 pp. .
 

Geologic groups of North Carolina
Campanian Stage
Cretaceous geology of North Carolina